Incidence may refer to:

Economics
 Benefit incidence, the availability of a benefit
 Expenditure incidence, the effect of government expenditure upon the distribution of private incomes
 Fiscal incidence, the economic impact of government taxation and expenditures on the economic income of individuals
 Tax incidence, analysis of the effect of a particular tax on the distribution of economic welfare

Mathematics
 Incidence algebra, associative algebra used in combinatorics, a branch of mathematics
 Incidence geometry, the study of relations of incidence between various geometrical objects 
 Incidence (geometry), the binary relations describing how subsets meet
 Incidence (graph), in graph theory, a quality of some vertex-edge pairs
 Incidence list, a concept in graph theory
 Incidence matrix, a matrix that shows the relationship between two classes of objects
 Incidence structure, a feature of combinatorial mathematics
 Cumulative incidence, a measure of frequency

Other uses
 Angle of incidence, a measure of deviation of something from "straight on"
 Incidence (epidemiology), a measure of the risk of developing some new condition within a specified period of time
 Plane of incidence, relating to optical reflection
 Incidence (video game), a minimalist golfing style game by ScrollView Games

See also
 Incidents, 1987 book
 Incident (disambiguation)